Cena Barhaghi (born December 13, 1990, in Boulder, Colorado), sometimes known as Lord Wave (stylized as LordWave) or simply Cena, is an American streetwear designer and entrepreneur. He is best known as the co-founder of the streetwear brand Pink Dolphin (stylized as PINK + DOLPHIN), which he founded in 2008 alongside Young L of The Pack.

Early life
Cena was raised in the San Francisco Bay Area in Fremont, California, where he attended Mission San Jose High School and San Jose State University.

Career
Cena got his start in graphic design by designing Myspace layouts with a company he started as a freshman in high school. He co-founded the Pink Dolphin clothing brand in 2008 during his senior year in high school with Young L of The Pack. The brand was initially funded by the founders with a little more than $400 in cash and a credit card. He later attended college at San Jose State University while working on building the Pink Dolphin clothing brand. With the money he had saved from his T-shirt profits and a little more from savings, he moved to Los Angeles in 2011 to further expand the brand out of a downtown L.A. warehouse. Barhaghi was still in college at this time and was traveling between San Jose and Los Angeles twice a week to attend classes. He eventually dropped out of college to pursue his passion for design and clothing full time. By 2013, the brand was operating two flagship stores in San Francisco & Los Angeles, carried in 320 stores nationwide, 17 countries around the world and valued at 20 million dollars. The brand has been worn by musicians such as Chris Brown, Wiz Khalifa and Rick Ross.

Cena is self-taught in design and has mentioned in many interviews that he learned how to use graphic design programs solely from internet tutorials.

Recognition
In 2014, he was listed in Los Angeles Business Journal'''s Twenty in their 20s'' article for his streetwear style and young entrepreneurial business contributions.

References

American fashion designers
Street fashion
1990 births
Living people